The history of the Jews of Eswatini, formerly Swaziland.

Modern times
In 2002, Swaziland's prime minister, Barnabas Dlamini, said the country appreciates the contribution of its Jewish community: "The Jewish community is small, numbering in the tens rather than hundreds, but over the years it has had quite an influence on the development of our country, the names Kirsh and Goldblatt will be remembered long after their time" referring to two well-known Jewish Swazi entrepreneurs. Kalman Goldblatt who later changed his name to Kal Grant came from Lithuania and built his wealth through several trading stores and by developing the first townships in the country.

In 2019 there is an estimated Jewish community of about 50 to 60 people. Eswatini/Swazi Jews have played an important role in the business and legal sectors of the economy. The community consists of Israelis, South African Jews, and descendants of World War II refugees. Some Holocaust survivors settled in Swaziland. Jews have experienced hardly any anti-Semitism. A notable Jew was Stanley Sapire, Chief Justice of the Swazi Court of Appeal.

Ties with Israel
In 2017 Israeli Prime Minister Benjamin Netanyahu and his Swazi counterpart, Prime Minister Dr Barnabas Sibusiso Dlamini (1942–2018) accompanied by his Agriculture Minister, Moses Vilakati met in Jerusalem. Netanyahu expressed his appreciation for Swazi King Mswati III's warm regards and ongoing admiration for Israel.

Notable people

Natan Gamedze

Rabbi Natan Gamedze (born 1963, Swaziland, since 2018 renamed to Eswatini) is a Haredi rabbi and lecturer. Born to the royal lineage of the Gamedze clan of the Kingdom of Swaziland, he converted to Judaism, received rabbinic ordination, and now lectures to Jewish audiences all over the world with his personal story as to how an African prince became a Black Haredi Jewish rabbi.

Nathan Kirsh

Nathan Kirsh (born 6 January 1932) is a South African/Swazi/Eswatini billionaire businessman. He heads the Kirsh Group, which holds a majority stake in New York cash and carry operation Jetro Holdings, owner of Restaurant Depot and Jetro Cash & Carry. The Group also holds equity and investments in Australia, Swaziland (now Eswatini), the UK, the US, and Israel. Bloomberg estimated his wealth at $6.09 billion in March 2019, ranking him at #267 on its "Billionaires Index". He was also listed on the UK's Sunday Times Rich List 2018, and was named as the wealthiest person in Eswatini by Forbes.

See also

 Religion in Eswatini 

 History of Eswatini
 History of the Jews in Mozambique
 History of the Jews in South Africa
 History of the Jews in Southern Africa

References

Eswatini
Jews
Jews and Judaism in Eswatini
Eswatini